Udaipur City railway station (station code: UDZ) is a railway station located in Udaipur, Rajasthan, India. The railway station is under the administrative control of North Western Railway of Indian Railways.

Overview
Udaipur City Railway Station has six platforms and a total of eight tracks. It is situated on the Udaipur Road, around 2.5 km from the city center, and around 25 km from Udaipur Airport. To decongest the main Udaipur City Railway Station, the suburban station Rana Pratap Nagar railway station is developed as the second main station for passenger trains and Umarda Railway Station  will be the third Railway Station of Udaipur.

The Living Wall

Udaipur City Railway Station is set to get a Living Wall, which is a self-sufficient vertical garden attached to the exterior or interior of the building. Initiated by the Railway and UIT, this project covered and converted a barren wall of 1,400 square feet into a beautiful green space. This project included installation of metal sheet frames (MS), followed by plantation in specially designed GI panels (Galvanized iron) hanging on the MS frame. Organic fertilizers have been used to grow plants to avoid overweight on the wall. The project costed approximately Rs 13.5 lakh, and took 14 days to complete.

Important trains

The following trains start from Udaipur City Railway Station:

See also
 Udaipur
 Udaipur Airport
 Udaipur City Bus Depot
 Rana Pratap Nagar railway station

References 

Buildings and structures in Udaipur
Railway stations in Udaipur district
Transport in Udaipur
Ajmer railway division